Uzakia is a monotypic genus of South Pacific araneomorph spiders in the family Cycloctenidae containing the single species, Uzakia unica. It was first described by A. Ö. Koçak & M. Kemal in 2008, and has only been found in New Zealand.

References

Cycloctenidae
Monotypic Araneomorphae genera
Spiders of New Zealand